The 1988 United States Senate election in California took place on November 8, 1988. Incumbent Republican U.S. Senator Pete Wilson won re-election to a second term. 

, this is the last time a Republican won a U.S. Senate election in California. This was also the first time since 1952 that an incumbent Senator was re-elected to this seat.

Democratic primary

Candidates 
 John Hancock Abbott, perennial candidate
 Robert John Banuelos, candidate for Senate in 1986
 Charles Greene, candidate for Senate in 1986 and Los Angeles County Sheriff in 1982
 Leo T. McCarthy, Lieutenant Governor of California and former Speaker of the California State Assembly

Results

Peace and Freedom primary

Candidates 
 Gloria Garcia, nominee for California Secretary of State in 1986
 Maria Elizabeth Muñoz, Chicana activist and nominee for Governor in 1986

Results

General election

Candidates
Joel Britton (Independent)
Jack Dean (Libertarian)
Leo T. McCarthy, Lieutenant Governor of California and former Speaker of the California State Assembly (Democratic)
Maria Elizabeth Muñoz, Chicana activist and nominee for Governor in 1986 (Peace and Freedom)
Merton D. Short (American Independent)
Pete Wilson, incumbent Senator (Republican)

Results

See also 
 1988 United States Senate elections

Notes

References 

1988
California
1988 California elections